Trichalphus pilosus is a species of beetle in the family Cerambycidae, the only species in the genus Trichalphus.

References

Acanthocinini